Ashot Yeghiazaryan (16 June 1943 – 26 December 2016) was an Armenian diplomat, Ambassador Extraordinary and Plenipotentiary of Armenia to Brazil.

References 
 Embassy of Armenia to Brazil

1943 births
2016 deaths
Politicians from Yerevan
Diplomats from Yerevan
Ambassadors of Armenia to Brazil
Foreign ministers of Armenia